QU, Qu or qu may refer to:

Arts and media
 QU (album), an album by the American band Sherwood
 Qu (poetry), a Chinese type of sung poetry
 A race of gourmands from the Square Enix console role-playing game Final Fantasy IX
 An alien species in C. M. Kosemen's science fiction novel All Tomorrows
 A member of the History Monks in Terry Pratchett's Discworld novels

People 
 Qu (surname 屈), Chinese surname

 Qu (surname 瞿), Chinese surname

 Qu (surname 曲), Chinese surname

Schools
 Qarshi University, Lahore, Pakistan
 Qassim University, Qassim, Saudi Arabia
 Qatar University, Doha, Qatar
 Queensland University, Brisbane, Queensland, Australia
 Queen's University at Kingston, Ontario, Canada
 Quincy University, Quincy, Illinois, United States
 Quinnipiac University, Hamden, Connecticut, United States

Other uses
 The Latin name for the Roman script letter Q;
 Qu (digraph), a digraph used in several languages;
 Qu County, county in Sichuan, China;
 Qū (曲/麹/麴), fermentation starters used in East Asia in the production of traditional Chinese alcoholic beverages;
 District (PRC and ROC) in the People's Republic of China and the Republic of China;
 Myrocarpus frondosus, a plant;
 Quechua languages, a group of Native American languages of South America (ISO 639-1 code "qu").

Chinese-language surnames